Robin Hood's Death, also known as Robin Hoode his Death, is a Middle English ballad of Robin Hood.  It dates from at the latest the 17th century, and possibly originating earlier, making it one of the oldest existing tales of Robin Hood.  It is a longer version of the last six stanzas of A Gest of Robyn Hode, suggesting that one of the authors was familiar with the other work and made an expansion (if Geste came first) or summary (if Death came first) of the other, or else both were drawing from a lost common tale.  The surviving version in the Percy Folio is fragmentary, with sections missing.  A more complete but later version is from the middle of the 18th century, and is written in modern English.  Both versions were later published by Francis James Child as Child ballad #120 in his influential collection of popular ballads.

Story
There are two different versions of Death: the fragmentary Percy Folio version dating from the 17th century ("A"), and a version from The English Archer c. 1767, published in 1786 ("B").  The original title is unknown; a scribe in the Percy Folio document titled it "Robin Hoode his Death", while later versions tended to use "Robin Hood's Death."  Half a page of each leaf has been torn away, so only 27 stanzas survive of a probable 50-something total.

In the "A" version of the Percy Folio, Robin Hood goes to get himself bled (a common medieval medical practice) by his cousin, a prioress. He refuses a bodyguard that Will Scarlet offers and takes only Little John with him. The prioress treacherously lets out too much blood, killing him, or Red Roger (presumably her lover Sir Roger of Doncaster) stabs him while he's weak (in revenge for Robin's family having inherited his land and title?). Robin Hood claims some consolation, though, in that he mortally wounds Roger prior to his own demise. Little John wishes to avenge him and set fire to Churchlees, but Robin forbids it, because he fears God will blame him if he hurts a widow at his own end.

An old woman appears early on the journey, "banning" Robin Hood. The manuscript breaks off for half a page, with outlaws asking why she is doing so. "Banning" is usually taken as "cursing" him, but may mean "lamenting"—predicting his death and weeping in advance. In the next surviving fragment, Robin Hood appears to be reassuring someone who has warned him he is going to his death.
	
The later broadside version of this ballad, first recorded in 1786, omits the mysterious people (or person) Robin Hood meets on his way, and Sir Roger of Doncaster.  It includes the idea of Robin Hood blowing his horn three times to summon Little John in distress as he realizes he has been betrayed.  The B version also adds the detail that Robin Hood shoots one final arrow and asks Little John to be buried where it falls.  Robin also says in his dying monologue that he has never harmed a woman when refusing permission to Little John to attack Kirkley-hall and does not intend to start now. The broadside is first recorded around the time that the Percy Folio version was first published, in the mid-eighteenth century.

This is now the most common account of Robin Hood's death.  It is in agreement with the last six stanzas of A Gest of Robyn Hode; the "pryoresse of Kyrkesly" and "Syr Roger of Donkesly" reappear as the prioress of Churchlees and Red Roger.  There is a different version in  Robin Hood and the Valiant Knight that commonly appeared in the Robin Hood "garlands" or collections, and another account in A True Tale of Robin Hood.

The name of Roger of Doncaster refers to a town near Barnsdale, where early ballads placed Robin Hood.

This version loosely inspired the ending of the 1976 film Robin and Marian.  In it, it is Robin's lover, Maid Marian, now a nun, who is his downfall, poisoning Robin and then herself when he suffers serious wounds in his final battle with the Sheriff of Nottingham, Marian wanting to spare him the personal anguish of living while incapable of being what he once was.

References

External links
Robin Hood's Death
 ROBIN HOOD'S DEATH
The Death of Robin Hood: Introduction

Child Ballads
Robin Hood ballads